Belgrade is the capital and largest city of Serbia.

Ethnicity
Source: Bureau of Statistics of Republic of Serbia, Census 2011

Religion 
Source: Bureau of Statistics of Republic of Serbia, Census 2011

References

Geography of Belgrade
Belgrade
Belgrade